PariSanté Campus is a digital health development centre created in December 2021 and located in the 15th arrondissement of Paris.

By 2028 it is expected to move to the Val-de-Grâce.

History 
The PariSanté Campus project was launched on December, 4 2020 by the President of the Republic Emmanuel Macron, the Minister for Solidarity and Health Olivier Véran, and the Minister for Higher Education, Research and Innovation Frédérique Vidal.

Campus 
This campus is supported by five public institutions, the Inserm, the Paris Sciences et Lettres University, the French Institute for Research in Computer Science and Automation, the Health Data Hub, and the Agence du numérique en santé. It hosts three research institutes, "PRAIRIE", "Q Bio", and the "Institut Physics for Medicine", as well as a structure dedicated to entrepreneurship (incubator and business center). PariSanté Campus has started operations in December 2021 on a building in the 15th arrondissement of Paris during the renovation of the former Val-de-Grâce hospital, which will then house the campus. The project is scheduled to be completed in 2028.

References

External link 
 Official website

Business incubators of France
Buildings and structures in the 15th arrondissement of Paris
Health informatics